Robert H. A. Roberts  (1892–?) was an English footballer. His regular position was at full back. He was born in Earlestown, Lancashire. He played for Manchester United and Altrincham.

External links
MUFCInfo.com profile

1892 births
English footballers
Manchester United F.C. players
Altrincham F.C. players
Year of death missing
Association football defenders